Khalfan Khamis Mohamed (born 5 March 1974), a Tanzanian national, is one of numerous al-Qaeda suspects who were indicted in 1998, and one of the four who were convicted and sentenced to life without parole in 2001, for their parts in the 1998 United States embassy bombings. Convicted along with Mohamed were Wadih el Hage, Mohammed Saddiq Odeh, and Mohamed Rashed Daoud Al-Owhali.

Mohamed is currently held in the supermax prison known as ADX Florence, Colorado.

Background and arrest
Khalfan Mohamed allegedly received training in Afghanistan. It is believed that Mohamed assembled the bomb used against the embassy in the Dar es Salaam, Tanzania, and flew to South Africa shortly after the bombing. He was arrested in Cape Town on October 5, 1999, after he was discovered to still be using the same alias he had used during the bombings. After interrogation, South African immigration authorities handed him over to FBI agents and he was flown to New York on the following day. (This extradition subsequently became the subject of a landmark decision of the Constitutional Court of South Africa, Mohamed v President of the Republic of South Africa, which determined that the South African government cannot extradite suspects who may face the death penalty.)

In June 2014, he successfully sued the US government for violating his Freedom of Speech by prohibiting his communications with all but a few immediate family members.

Failed escape
On November 2, 2000, Mohamed and Mamdouh Mahmud Salim (also of al-Qaeda) attacked a federal prison guard in a failed escape attempt. The officer was critically injured, having been stabbed in the eye with a sharpened comb, and suffered severe brain damage from the attack. During the sentencing phase of his trial, prosecutors argued unsuccessfully for capital punishment of Mohamed, due to the continuing threat he posed to prison guards.

References

1974 births
Living people
Tanzanian al-Qaeda members
Inmates of ADX Florence
Tanzanian people imprisoned abroad
People extradited from South Africa
People extradited to the United States
Tanzanian prisoners sentenced to life imprisonment
Prisoners sentenced to life imprisonment by the United States federal government
Tanzanian people convicted of murder
People convicted of murder by the United States federal government
People convicted on terrorism charges